The Oakland Railroad Company operated the first horsecar railroad in Oakland, California. The company was incorporated in 1864 to offer transportation for students of private schools on Academy Hill (later known as Pill Hill.) Service began in 1869 over strap iron rails laid on wooden stringers connected by wooden cross ties. The line initially ran along Broadway from First Street to Telegraph Road, and thence along Telegraph Avenue to the city limit at 36th Street. By 1874 a stable of 51 horses was pulling 13 one-horse cars for normal runs and 6 two-horse cars used when larger numbers of passengers were expected. The large car barn and stable on 51st street was later converted to a supermarket. A round trip from Oakland to Temescal and return was scheduled to take one hour, and three such trips were a day's work for the horses while their drivers worked a 14-hour day, 7 days a week. A steam dummy replaced horses on one of the larger cars in 1875.

Comstock Lode silver baron James Graham Fair purchased the line in 1885 and converted some segments to the  narrow gauge of his connecting South Pacific Coast Railroad. Fair then sold the line to Southern Pacific's subsidiary Pacific Improvement Company in 1887, after his attempts to replace horses with steam locomotives were opposed by Oakland residents. Pacific Improvement Company electrified the line about 1892, and the electrified line merged into the Key System predecessor Oakland Transit Company in 1901. The Telegraph Avenue rails were removed in 1954. The body of one of the original horse cars survived until 1948 as a playhouse for the children of a family on Delaware Street in Berkeley, and was subsequently donated to the California State Railroad Museum.

References

Defunct California railroads
Electric railways in California
Passenger rail transportation in California
Defunct public transport operators in the United States
History of Oakland, California
History of Alameda County, California
Rail transportation in Oakland, California
Transportation companies based in California
Public transportation in Alameda County, California
1865 establishments in California
Defunct companies based in California